E–Z configuration, or the E–Z convention, is the IUPAC preferred method of describing the absolute stereochemistry of double bonds in organic chemistry. It is an extension of cis–trans isomer notation (which only describes relative stereochemistry) that can be used to describe double bonds having two, three or four substituents.

Following the Cahn–Ingold–Prelog priority rules (CIP rules), each substituent on a double bond is assigned a priority, then positions of the higher of the two substituents on each carbon are compared to each other. If the two groups of higher priority are on opposite sides of the double bond (trans to each other), the bond is assigned the configuration E (from entgegen, the German word for "opposite"). If the two groups of higher priority are on the same side of the double bond (cis to each other), the bond is assigned the configuration Z (from zusammen, the German word for "together").

The letters E and Z are conventionally printed in italic type, within parentheses, and separated from the rest of the name with a hyphen. They are always printed as full capitals (not in lowercase or small capitals), but do not constitute the first letter of the name for English capitalization rules (as in the example above). 

Another example: The CIP rules assign a higher priority to bromine than to chlorine, and a higher priority to chlorine than to hydrogen, hence the following (possibly counterintuitive) nomenclature.

For organic molecules with multiple double bonds, it is sometimes necessary to indicate the alkene location for each E or Z symbol. For example, the chemical name of alitretinoin is (2E,4E,6Z,8E)-3,7-dimethyl-9-(2,6,6-trimethyl-1-cyclohexenyl)nona-2,4,6,8-tetraenoic acid, indicating that the alkenes starting at positions 2, 4, and 8 are E while the one starting at position 6 is Z.

See also
 Descriptor (chemistry)
 Geometric isomerism
 Molecular geometry

References 
 

Chemistry prefixes
Stereochemistry